Rosette cookies are thin, cookie-like fritters made with iron molds that are found in many cultures.  Rosettes are crispy and typified by their lacy pattern. Rosettes are traditionally made during Christmas time.  Rosette recipes are popular in the United States among families with Scandinavian ancestry.

They are made using intricately designed rosette irons.  These sweet fried cookies are shaped like a rose, complete with holes to represent layers of petals. The batter is a blend of wheat flour, eggs, sugar and whole milk. The iron has a handle with a bow shape attached to the outermost.  The iron is heated to a very high temperature in oil, dipped into the batter, then re-immersed in the hot oil to create a crisp shell around the metal. The iron is lifted from the oil after a short time and the rosette is separated from the iron. Usually, the edges of rosettes are dipped into frosting or sugar.

Swedish timbale can be made with rosette batter using a timbale mold instead of an iron. These can be made with savory fillings like creamed chicken and mushrooms.

Preparation

Rosette cookies are made with a rosette iron. This specialized tool has a long handle and with a metal shape, commonly stars, flowers, snowflakes or Christmas trees. The metal is heated in hot oil before it is dipped in batter. Returning the iron to the oil, the batter is detached from the mold when it is partially cooked and gently flipped to finish cooking. They are usually topped with sugar or honey. The process was recorded in the 19th century Ottoman cookbook Aşçı başı.

Geographic distribution

Versions of this cookie exist in northern Europe, Iran, Turkey, Sri Lanka (kokis), and other places.

They are typical of Anglo-Indian cuisine and a favourite among Indian Christians during the Christmas season. They are very popular in Kerala.  In India, they are made from flour, sugar, eggs and coconut milk.

Other names
This type of fritter exists in many cultures and is known as struvor in Swedish, flores manchegas and ("Manchegan flowers") in Spain.

In the Middle East and western Asia, it is called shirini panjerei شیرینی پنجره‌ای in Iran, demir tatlisi in Turkish, and chebbak el-janna in Tunisian cuisine. In Afghanistan they are called kulcha-e-panjerei (window biscuits). In Sri Lanka It's kokis. 

They are called rose cookies or rose biscuits in Indian English. In Bangladesh Its called Fuljhuri pitha or Fulkuchi pitha. In Malaysia it is called kuih Loyang.  They are called Gulabi Puvvulu in Telugu.  In Odia it's called Mahughara Khaja. In Tamil it is called Acchu Murukku and in Malayalam it is Achappam.

See also
 List of fried dough varieties 
 Christmas cookies
 Christmas dishes
 Cuisine of Norway
 Cuisine of Sweden

References

Related reading
Astrid Karlsen Scott (2000) Authentic Norwegian Cooking (Nordic Adventures) 
Jan Hedh  (2012) Swedish Cookies, Tarts, and Pies (Skyhorse)

External links
 

Christmas food
Fritters
Norwegian desserts
Swedish desserts
Turkish desserts
Afghan desserts
Tunisian cuisine